Reiner Hollich (born 11 November 1955) is a German former footballer who played as a midfielder.

References

External links

1955 births
Living people
German footballers
Association football midfielders
SV Waldhof Mannheim players
SV Sandhausen players
2. Bundesliga players
German football managers
SV Waldhof Mannheim managers
Footballers from Mannheim